O-hook (Ҩ ҩ; italics: Ҩ ҩ) is a letter of the Cyrillic script. It is derived from the initial form of the Arabic letter hāʾ, . In the Unicode text-encoding standard, this letter is called "Abkhazian Ha". Its form bears some similarities to the Greek letter Theta (Θ θ/). In English, O-hook is commonly romanized using the Latin letter O with dot below (Ọ ọ) but its ISO 9 transliteration is the Latin letter O with grave accent (Ò ò).

It is placed between Ы and Џ in the alphabet.

Computing codes

 In Unicode version 1.0, the letters were called CYRILLIC CAPITAL/SMALL LETTER O HOOK.

References

Further reading
 Daniels, Peter D. The World's Writing Systems. Oxford University Press, 1996.